23 Ursae Majoris, or 23 UMa,  is a binary star system in the constellation Ursa Major, located is approximately 77.7 light years from the Sun. It has the Bayer designation h Ursae Majoris; 23 Ursae Majoris is the Flamsteed designation. The system is visible to the naked eye as a yellow-white hued star with an apparent visual magnitude of +3.65. It is moving closer to the Earth with a heliocentric radial velocity of −10 km/s.

The primary component is a yellow-white F-type subgiant with an apparent magnitude of +3.65. It has 1.9 times the Sun's mass, 2.9 times the Sun's radius and is emitting 15 times the luminosity of the Sun at an effective temperature of 6,651 K. Orbiting at an angular separation of 22.7 arcseconds is the 9th magnitude secondary companion. There is a magnitude +10.5 optical companion at an angular separation of 99.6 arcseconds.

Nomenclature

With τ, υ, φ, θ, e and f, it composed the Arabic asterism Sarīr Banāt al-Na'sh, the Throne of the daughters of Na'sh, and Al-Haud, the Pond. According to the catalogue of stars in the Technical Memorandum 33-507 - A Reduced Star Catalog Containing 537 Named Stars, Al-Haud were the title for seven stars : f as Alhaud I, τ as Alhaud II, e as Alhaud III, this star (h) as Alhaud IV, θ as Alhaud V, υ as Alhaud VI and φ as Alhaud VII .

References

External links
 23 Ursae Majoris at Jim Kaler's STARS

Ursae Majoris, 23
Ursa Major (constellation)
Binary stars
F-type subgiants
Ursae Majoris, h
Suspected variables
3757
081937
046733
Durchmusterung objects
Alhaud IV